The Vietnamese National Youth Football Championship, is the national championship of association football for male players under the age of 13 organized by Vietnam Football Federation(VFF).

Results

References 
Notes

References

External links 

Football leagues in Vietnam
Youth football in Vietnam